Allen is a city in Collin County in the U.S. state of Texas, and a northern suburb of Dallas. According to the 2020 U.S. census its population was 104,627, up from 84,246 in 2010.

History

The Allen area was previously home to the Caddo, Comanche, and other indigenous peoples. The first immigrants from the United States and Europe arrived in the early 1840s. The town was established by the Houston and Texas Central Railway and named in 1872 for Ebenezer Allen, a state politician and railroad promoter. The railroad allowed sale of crops across the country before they rotted, causing a shift from the previous cattle-based agriculture. On February 22, 1878, a gang led by Sam Bass committed in Allen what is said to be Texas's first train robbery.

From 1908 through 1948, Allen was a stop along the Texas Traction Company's interurban line from Denison to Dallas. Allen was a small town of a few hundred residents when it was incorporated in 1953. Since this time, it has grown dramatically due to the construction of U.S. Route 75, the Dallas/Fort Worth International Airport, and the development of nearby Dallas and Plano. Among the more recent developments is the Shaddock Park neighborhood.

Geography

None of the area is covered with water except the small ponds scattered throughout the city.

Climate
Allen has a humid subtropical climate (Cfa in the Köppen climate classification), with long hot summers and cool winters.

In 2008, an EF-1 tornado touched down in Allen, damaging approximately 50 homes. In 2019, an EF-0 tornado touched down in west Allen.

Demographics

Per the 2020 United States census, there were 104,627 people, 33,649 households, and 26,878 families residing in the city.

According to the 2019 American Community Survey, the racial and ethnic makeup of the city was 59.3% non-Hispanic or non-Latino white, 8.3% Black or African American, 0.1% American Indian and Alaska Native, 18.6% Asian, 1.4% two or more races, and 12.3% Hispanic and Latino American of any race. At the 2010 census, the racial and ethnic makeup was 69.5% white (61.1% non-Hispanic white), 9.0% Black or African American, 0.4% Native American, 16.2% Asian, 0.1% Pacific Islander, and 3.5% from two or more races; Hispanic or Latino Americans of any race were 10.9% of the population.

In 2010, there were 14,205 households, out of which 55.5% had children under the age of 18 living with them, 74.6% were married couples living together, 7.4% had a female householder with no husband present, and 15.2% were non-families. 11.9% of all households were made up of individuals, and 1.6% had someone living alone who was 65 years of age or older. The average household size was 3.07 and the average family size was 3.35. In 2019, 96% of adults living in Allen had at least high school degree and 55% had at least a bachelor's degree.

In the city, the population was spread out, with 34.9% under the age of 18, 5.4% from 18 to 24, 40.7% from 25 to 44, 16.2% from 45 to 64, and 2.8% who were 65 years of age or older. The median age was 31 years. For every 100 females, there were 99.7 males. For every 100 females age 18 and over, there were 97.3 males.

In 2019, 96% of adults living in Allen had at least high school degree and 55% had at least a bachelor's degree. The average household income was $107,602. The city of Allen had 27,791 family units. The median age was 35.8 years. The median home value was $251,405. 59,620 of the population is currently registered to vote.

Economy
In 1992, Allen citizens approved the creation of the Allen Economic Development Corporation, which is funded by a 0.5% sales tax. According to the city government's 2014 facts & figures, the top employers in the city were:

Allen serves as the corporate headquarters for the following companies: MonkeySports, CVE Technology, PFSweb, WatchGuard Video, PINSTACK, Boss Fight Entertainment, Brass Roots Technologies, Cytracom, No Magic, Lyrick Studios, WiQuest Communications, and Credit Union of Texas. Lyrick Studios ceased to exist in 2001 when it was purchased and incorporated into HiT Entertainment.

The city also has a 79,000-square-foot convention center (Watters Creek Convention Center) owned and operated by Marriott Hotels. In addition, Allen also has a multi-purpose arena, the 7,500-seat Credit Union of Texas Event Center, owned and operated by the City of Allen. There are three major malls/shopping complexes in the city: Allen Premium Outlets, Watters Creek, and The Village at Allen. These shopping complexes attract many visitors to Allen, Texas on a daily basis.

Allen also boasts many luxury hotels often used by visitors and business-people: Hyatt Place Dallas/Allen, Hilton Garden Inn Dallas-Allen, Courtyard by Marriott Dallas Allen at Allen Event Center, and Delta Hotels by Marriott Dallas Allen.

Parks and recreation
Allen has two major recreation centers: Joe Farmer Recreation Center and Don Rodenbaugh Natatorium. Don Rodenbaugh Natatorium boasts a large-scale indoor aquatic park with many swimming lanes, a rock-climbing wall, and a fitness center. Allen also boasts the Allen Community Ice Rink, Ford Pool, The Courses at Watters Creek, and Allen Senior Recreation Center. Most notably, Allen has The Edge Skate Park and Visitor Center, a 37,915-square-foot outdoor skate park making it one of the largest skate parks in Texas.

Allen is also home to 60 natural and man-made parks with over 1,188 acres of park land in total. Some of the more notable parks are the following: Allen Station Park, Bethany Lakes Park, Celebration Park, Glendover Park, Spirit Park, Stacy Ridge, Twin Creeks Park, Waterford Park, and Windridge Park.

Every year, Allen hosts the Allen USA Celebration on the last Saturday of June, which usually falls on the Saturday preceding the Independence Day holiday. The celebration boasts a large assortment of food trucks/stalls, sports drills, music concerts, a car show, bounce houses, and a large fireworks display - regarded as one of the largest in Texas. In previous years, there have been performances by Pentatonix, Jerry Jeff Walker, Vince Vance & the Valiants, Survivor, James "J.T." Taylor, Eddie Money, 38 Special, Three Dog Night, Commodores, Michael McDonald, and Lou Gramm. Now, the event draws in around 100,000 people annually and is considered to be the largest event in Allen.

Sports

In October 2004, the City of Allen purchased Chase Oaks Golf Club in Plano, Texas, adjacent to the southern city limits of the City of Allen. Chase Oaks, since renamed The Courses at Watters Creek, is a public golf course, and residents are entitled to discounted fees.

A multi-purpose arena, the 7,500-seat Credit Union of Texas Event Center, was completed in November 2009. It is home to the ECHL's Allen Americans and the Dallas Sidekicks of the Major Arena Soccer League.

Government
According to the city's most recent Comprehensive Annual Financial Report, the city's various funds had $160.9 million in revenues, $105.6 million in expenditures, $654.8 million in total assets, $125.6 million in total liabilities, and $42.5 million in cash and investments.

The city of Allen is a voluntary member of the North Central Texas Council of Governments association, the purpose of which is to coordinate individual and collective local governments and facilitate regional solutions, eliminate unnecessary duplication, and enable joint decisions.

The Allen City Council consists of the mayor and six council members, who are elected to serve three year terms. The council's responsibilities include planning and approving the budget, setting policy, enacting ordinances, establishing municipal law, regulating zoning, and appointing board and commission members. A professionally trained city manager manages day-to-day operations.

Appointments to City of Allen boards, commissions, and committees are typically two-year staggered terms, though some are three-year appointments.

Politics 
Allen, like the rest of Collin County, was solidly Republican throughout the early 2000s, but it has shifted significantly towards the Democratic Party in recent elections, culminating in Democrat Joe Biden's narrow victory in the city in 2020.

State and federal representation 
The current state senator for Texas Senate, District 8 is Angela Paxton. Jeff Leach is the state representative for District 67 and Candy Noble is the state representative for District 89. Allen residents are represented in the United States Congress by Senators Ted Cruz and John Cornyn and representative Van Taylor.

Education

Colleges
Allen hosts a campus of Collin College, which is located inside Allen High School and mainly serves dual-credit high school students. A separate Collin College Technical Campus, opened in 2020, is located in west Allen. The 340,000 square-foot facility serves more than 7,000 students when fully occupied and is dedicated to workforce education.

Public schools

The Allen Independent School District has 18 elementary schools, 3 middle schools, 1 freshman center (Lowery Freshman Center), 1 alternative education center, and 1 high school (Allen High School). Allen ISD serves almost all of Allen. Allen ISD opened a 111,000 square-foot STEAM center. It also serves as a location for elementary and middle school field trip experiences for enrichment on STEAM topics and experiences.

Small portions of the Allen city limits extend into Lovejoy, McKinney, and Plano ISDs. In the fall of 2006, new 9th grade high school students in the Lovejoy ISD boundaries began attending the newly opened Lovejoy High School. The school became a full 4-year high school in the 2009–10 school year.

Eagle Stadium opened on August 31, 2012, at a cost of $60 million and seats 18,000 people.

Allen High School offers advanced academic coursework through AP and IB courses. AP course enrollment is 53%.

Public libraries
The city of Allen possesses one sole library located in Downtown Allen: Allen Public Library. As of the 2019 City of Allen Facts and Figures, Allen has 147,772 volumes and 406,595 people were said to have visited the library.

Transportation
Allen is served directly by several major roadways and freeways. Allen is bisected by U.S. Highway 75 and bordered to the west by Texas State Highway 121. Some of the major roadways in Allen are: Stacy Road, Exchange Parkway, McDermott Drive, Main Street, Alma Drive, Greenville Avenue, Ridgeview Drive, Allen Heights Drive, Angel Parkway, and Bethany Drive. Currently, with the large increase in its population and its ongoing retail and business development, traffic has become congested.

Currently, the Dallas Area Rapid Transit (DART) train system in the Dallas/Fort Worth metroplex does not extend into the City of Allen, though there has been ongoing discussion of possible expansion into Allen. Active Red Line service is unable to expand further north because Allen is currently unable to levy the 1% sales tax required for DART membership. Allen levies sales tax at the maximum rate of 8.25% set by Texas law. Redirecting 1% sales tax for DART membership would require scrapping funding for the Allen Economic Development Corporation and the Allen Community Development Corporation.

Allen is roughly 30 miles northeast of Dallas/Fort Worth International Airport, which is the primary airport serving Allen residents and visitors. It is also roughly 30 miles northeast of Dallas Love Field Airport.

Notable people

Notes

References

External links
City of Allen official website

 
Dallas–Fort Worth metroplex
Cities in Collin County, Texas
Cities in Texas
Populated places established in 1872
1872 establishments in Texas